Angel-Seeker is a science fantasy novel by American writer Sharon Shinn, published in 2004. It is the fifth novel in the Samaria series.  It is set shortly after Archangel.

Plot summary
Samaria is a changed land. Corrupt politicians are gone. The poor are not so destitute. The Edori are no longer slaves. Elizabeth is a young, healthy farm-girl. Tired of her lot in life, she leaves for Cedar Hills with one goal in mind. To birth the child of one of the powerful Angel beings and live in the lap of luxury for the rest of her natural life. The story also focuses on the isolated life of Rebekah, a Jansai woman and the Angel Obadiah, whom she nurses back to health after he is wounded flying over the desert.

References 

2004 American novels
American fantasy novels
Novels by Sharon Shinn
Samaria series

Ace Books books